Bernard Jackman (born 5 May 1976) is an Irish former rugby union player who played for Connacht, Leinster and Sale Sharks. At international level, he has also played for Ireland. He released his autobiography, Blue Blood in 2011.  He was dismissed as the head coach of Welsh Pro14 side the Dragons in December 2018. Jackman is the current head coach of Bective Rangers FC.

Early life
Born 5 May 1976, Tullow, County Carlow, Republic of Ireland, Jackman was educated at College and Dublin City University where he studied a degree in business studies and Japanese.

Playing career

Club rugby 
Jackman was persuaded by Warren Gatland to turn professional and subsequently had two spells playing for Connacht. In between he also played for Sale Sharks, helping them win the 2001–02 European Challenge Cup. he

In 2005 Jackman signed for Leinster. A broken leg hindered his early Leinster career but he eventually established himself as a first team regular. He was a prominent member of the team that won the 2007–08 Celtic League title and he also earned himself a recall into the senior Ireland squad. He has now retired from the professional game after a concussion injury in 2010. Bernard Jackman has become an acting ambassador for Acquired Brain Injury Ireland, standing strongly behind the concussion awareness campaign 'Mind your Head in Sport'. John Fogarty another Leinster Hooker had to retire with a similar concussion injury soon after.

Ireland international
Jackman represented Ireland at U19, U21 and college levels and  captained Ireland A before graduating to the senior Ireland team. He was included in the squad for the 1998 tour of South Africa but was not capped. He was capped twice during the 2005 tour of Japan and won two further caps during the 2007 tour of Argentina. He was also included in Ireland's 2008 Six Nations Championship squad and featured in all five games.

Coaching career
Jackman has coached several junior Leinster teams, including Tullow RFC, Newbridge RFC and Coolmine RFC. He has guided Newbridge to victory in both a league title and the Lalor Cup. In May 2009, he was appointed Director of Rugby and forwards coach of Clontarf FC.

In 2011 he was appointed on a consultancy basis as skills and forwards coach with FC Grenoble and made full-time for the 2012/2013 season. In June 2016, following the departure of Fabrice Landreau, he became Head Coach of FC Grenoble.
In March 2017, with the club bottom of the Top14 Jackman left Grenoble. Grenoble were subsequently relegated at the end of the 2016-17 season.

For 2017-18, he became head coach at the Dragons in Wales. Jackman parted company with the Dragons in December 2018 after 18 months in charge.

In May 2019, Jackman was announced as the new head of coaching of Bective Rangers FC, a Dublin based club and one of Ireland's oldest existing rugby clubs. On his appointment to Bective Rangers, Jackman said "I always found Bective to be a club with great people and having helped out the squad at the end of [last] season I think they have the potential for future success”.

Honours
Sale Sharks

European Challenge Cup
Winners: 2001–02: 1

Leinster

Celtic League
Winners: 2007–08: 1
Runners up: 2005–06: 1
Heineken Cup
Winners: 2008–09: 1

Books

 Blue Blood – The Bernard Jackman Autobiography,

References

External links
 

1976 births
Living people
Sportspeople from County Carlow
People educated at Newbridge College
Irish rugby union players
Ireland international rugby union players
Leinster Rugby players
Connacht Rugby players
Clontarf FC players
Lansdowne Football Club players
Sale Sharks players
Rugby union hookers
Irish rugby union coaches
Dragons RFC coaches